Martin Artyukh (born 6 May 1996) is a Belarusian footballer who plays for Isloch Minsk Raion.

References

External links

1996 births
Living people
Belarusian footballers
Association football midfielders
FC Slonim-2017 players
FC Gorodeya players
FC Baranovichi players
FC Isloch Minsk Raion players